Lake Lama is a large freshwater lake (of tectonic origin) in Krasnoyarsk Krai, north-central part of Russia.

Geography
It is 80 km long and up to 8 km wide (other sources state length of 100 km and width of 20 km) with a depth ranging from 300 to 600 m. Lake Lama is connected with Lake Melkoye by the Lama River.

The lake was surveyed and described for the first time by Russian scientist Nikolay Urvantsev and his colleague Bazanov during an expedition in 1921.

Origin of the name 
The hydronym Lama comes from Tungusic word laamu where it mean sea, ocean, big water.

There was no lake named Lama on the map of Russian Asia published in 1911 by the Russian General staff. The lake was pictured very approximately and was named Davydovo.

See also
List of lakes of Russia

References

Lakes of Krasnoyarsk Krai